Baranavichy Ghetto was a ghetto created in August 1941 in the city of Baranavichy, Belarus with more than 12,000 Jews kept in terrible conditions in six buildings at the outskirts. From March 4 to December 14, 1942, the entire Jewish population of the ghetto was sent to various extermination camps and killed in gas chambers. Only about 250 survived the war.

The Ghetto was administered by a local Judenrat.

References

Jewish ghettos in Nazi-occupied Belarus
Jewish history